A nice guy is an informal term for a male who portrays himself as agreeable.

Nice Guy may also refer to:

 Nice Guy (album), by American country musician Eric Paslay, or its title song
 "Nice Guy" (song), by American hip hop rapper Eminem
 The Nice Guys, a 2016 American action comedy film
 "Nice Guy", a 2012 song by Lukas Graham from Lukas Graham
 An alternative name for the South Korean TV series The Innocent Man

See also
 Mr. Nice Guy (disambiguation)